Johnny Campbell (14 October 1894 – 3 October 1981) was an English footballer who played as a wing half for Ocean Athletic and Tranmere Rovers. He made 207 appearances for Tranmere, scoring 11 goals.

References

Tranmere Rovers F.C. players
1894 births
1981 deaths
English footballers
Sportspeople from Birkenhead
Association football wing halves